Gilberto García may refer to:
 Gilberto García (footballer, born 1959)
 Gilberto García (footballer, born 1987)
 Gilberto García (footballer, born 2000)
 Gilberto García (chess player)
 Gilberto García (judoka)
 Gilberto García Mena, Mexican drug lord